Oz Comic Con is a speculative fiction entertainment and comic convention that has been running since 2012 within various major Australian cities, and is a local franchise of the New York Comic-Con. Attendees have included Nintendo Australia. Oz Comic Con in 2023 will run in the cities of Sydney, Brisbane, Adelaide and Canberra.

Locations and dates

External links

References

Annual events in Australia
Comics conventions
Conventions in Australia
Events in Adelaide
Events in Brisbane
Events in Melbourne
Events in Perth, Western Australia
Events in Sydney
Festivals in Australia
Multigenre conventions
Recurring events established in 2012
2012 establishments in Australia